Azat Armenaki Sherents (April 5, 1913, Tiflis, Georgia - December 25, 1993, Yerevan, Armenia) was one of the founders of Armenian cinematographic comedy. In 1931 he started his acting career on the stage of Sundukyan Drama Theater in Yerevan. In 1934-1937 he studied in Armenian Theater Studio in Moscow. In 1937-1968 Sherents performed in Leninakan Drama Theater. Since 1968 he worked at Armenfilm studio, starring in a number of Armenian films until his death in 1993.

Filmography

External links

Persons.am profile

Ethnic Armenian male actors
Soviet Armenians
Soviet male actors
1913 births
1993 deaths